"The Right Kinda Lover" is a song by American singer and actress Patti LaBelle. It was written by Ann Bennett-Nesby, James Harris III, Terry Lewis, and James "Big Jim" Wright, while production was helmed by Jimmy Jam and Terry Lewis, with Wright as co-producing. The song was released as the first single from her LaBelle's 12th album, Gems (1994), and appeared on the soundtrack to the 1994 film Beverly Hills Cop III, starring Eddie Murphy.

In the United States, "The Right Kinda Lover" reached number 61 on the Billboard Hot 100 and number eight on the Hot R&B/Hip-Hop Songs. It also became LaBelle's second number one on the Dance Club Songs. Overseas, the single also reached number fifty on the UK Singles Chart. The song's video featured LaBelle performing as a seductress choosing her choice of mate.

Critical reception
Larry Flick from Billboard wrote, "At age 50, the divine Ms. LaBelle puts out more verve and energy than a lot of performers half her age.
The juicy funk throwdown is featured on her new album, Gems, as well as the soundtrack to Beverly Hills Cop III, and is ripe for picking by R&B, pop, and club programmers. Producers Jam and Lewis surround LaBelle's distinctive voice with phat, rugged grooves and a lively, synth-activated melody. Fab single's bright future is sealed with an array of remixes that range from street hip hop to hearty house." 

Troy J. Augusto from Cash Box described it as "a funkified, boisterous cut that will no doubt find the lady back at the top of many formats' charts. Contemporary without sounding forced, courtesy of golden egg production team [...], and sophisticated without sounding stuffy, it’s a song that promises to provide many happy summertime memories." Bill Speed and John Martinucci from the Gavin Report declared it "a midtempoed groove that gets your body shaking while singing the praises of finding Mr. Right." Andy Beevers from Music Week gave the song four out of five, adding that the remixes "work very well and will help soul stalwart Labelle reach some new audiences."

Credits and personnel
Credits adapted from the liner notes of Gems.

Ann Bennett-Nesby – writer
James Harris III – producer, writer
Patti LaBelle – executive producer
Terry Lewis – producer, writer
Jimmy Wright – co-producer, writer

Charts

Weekly charts

Year-end charts

Release history

References

1993 songs
1994 singles
MCA Records singles
Patti LaBelle songs
Song recordings produced by Jimmy Jam and Terry Lewis
Songs written by Ann Nesby
Songs written by Jimmy Jam and Terry Lewis